Qadirganj, also spelled Kadirganj, is a city in the Etah Zila of Uttar Pradesh, India. Qadirganj is home to the Patna Bird Sanctuary and the city's access points are the Ganj Dundwara Railway Station and Agra Civil Enclaves.

References

External links
Islamic Prayer Times for Qadirganj, India

Cities and towns in Etah district